USS Sussex (SP-685) was a commercial fishing freighter acquired by the U.S. Navy during World War I. She served as a minesweeper on the U.S. East Coast through the war and was sold after the World War I Armistice.

A steamer built in Delaware
The first ship to be so named by the Navy, Sussex (SP-685) -- a fishing steamer built in 1913 by R. T. Potter at Milton, Delaware—was acquired by the Navy on 5 May 1917 from the Delaware Fish Oil Co., Lewes, Delaware; and was commissioned on 31 May 1917.

First World War service
Sussex operated as a minesweeper in the Third Naval District for the remainder of the conflict and for a few months following the November 1918 Armistice.

Post-war inactivation
She was struck from the Navy list on 11 March 1919 and sold on 16 January 1920.

References
 
 NavSource Online: Section Patrol Craft Photo Archive - Sussex (SP 685)
 USS Sussex (SP-685), 1917-1920

Ships built in Milton, Delaware
1913 ships
Minesweepers of the United States Navy
World War I minesweepers of the United States